"Outlaw in 'Em" is a song written by Jim Beavers, Waylon and Ilya Toshinskiy and performed by Dutch singer Waylon. It represented Netherlands in the Eurovision Song Contest 2018 in Lisbon, Portugal. The single was released on 2 March 2018.

Eurovision Song Contest

On 9 November 2017, Dutch national broadcaster AVROTROS announced Waylon as the Dutch entrant at the Eurovision Song Contest 2018. Waylon had previously represented the Netherlands in 2014 as part of The Common Linnets alongside Ilse DeLange. Their song "Calm After the Storm" earned 238 points in the final, placing them second. Prior to the official presentation of the song on 2 March 2018, Waylon presented five songs – including the official Dutch entry for the Eurovision Song Contest – from his upcoming album The World Can Wait on talk show De Wereld Draait Door, hosted by Matthijs van Nieuwkerk and aired on NPO 1. The Netherlands competed in the first half of the second semi-final at the Eurovision Song Contest.

Track listing

Charts

Release history

References

Eurovision songs of the Netherlands
Eurovision songs of 2018
2018 songs
2018 singles
Warner Music Group singles
Songs written by Jim Beavers